Otilioleptidae is a monotypic harvestmen family, placed within Gonyleptoidea. It contains a single genus, Otilioleptes, and a single species, Otilioleptes marcelae . This harvestman is a troglobite, to date only found in the lava tube known as "Doña Otilia", Payunia region, Mendoza province, Argentina.

References

Harvestman families
Monogeneric arthropod families
Harvestmen